Kalateh-ye Mirza Mohammad Ali (also Romanized as Kalāteh-ye Mīrzā Moḩammad ʿAlī; also known as Kalāteh-ye Mīrzā Moḩammad Reẕā) is a village in Sudlaneh Rural District, in the Central District of Quchan County, Razavi Khorasan Province, Iran. At the 2006 census, its population was 132, in 38 families.

References 

Populated places in Quchan County